Calle Concordia (Concordia Street) is a short but important thoroughfare running north–south through the Mayagüez, Puerto Rico neighborhood of El Seco. The street runs for 0.72 miles and is signed as Puerto Rico Highway 3342 and begins at the intersection of PR-102 and PR-64 and ends as a dead end at the Yagüez River, just south of Calle San Pablo (San Pablo Street). Calle Concordia also forms the western boundary of the Concordia Public Housing Complex.

Major intersections

See also

References

External links
 

3342
Streets in Mayagüez, Puerto Rico